Manickam Dorai was the fourth  Bishop of Coimbatore.

Notes

21st-century Anglican bishops in India
Indian bishops
Indian Christian religious leaders
Anglican bishops of Coimbatore